Dubbak Assembly constituency is a constituency of Telangana Legislative Assembly, India. It is one of 10 constituencies in Medak district. It is part of Medak Lok Sabha constituency.

Mandals
The Assembly Constituency presently comprises the following Mandals:

Members of Vidhan Sabha

^ by-poll

Election results

2020 by-election

Telangana Legislative Assembly election, 2018

Telangana Legislative Assembly election, 2014

Andhra Pradesh Legislative Assembly election, 2009

See also
 List of constituencies of Telangana Legislative Assembly

References

External links
"Telangana by election 2020 Dubbaka Election polls"
Dubbak 2014 Assembly Results Boothwise
Dubbak 2018 Assembly Results Boothwise
Dubbak 2020 Assembly Results candidate wise performance

Assembly constituencies of Telangana
Medak district